The 1908 Boston Doves season was the 38th season of the franchise.

Regular season 

On April 29, New York Giants manager John McGraw ridiculed Doves player and former Giants player Dan McGann by calling him an ice wagon. Many former Giants were now on the Doves roster. McGraw and McGann engaged in a fight at the Copley Square Hotel.

Season standings

Record vs. opponents

Roster

Player stats

Batting

Starters by position 
Note: Pos = Position; G = Games played; AB = At bats; H = Hits; Avg. = Batting average; HR = Home runs; RBI = Runs batted in

Other batters 
Note: G = Games played; AB = At bats; H = Hits; Avg. = Batting average; HR = Home runs; RBI = Runs batted in

Pitching

Starting pitchers 
Note: G = Games pitched; IP = Innings pitched; W = Wins; L = Losses; ERA = Earned run average; SO = Strikeouts

Other pitchers 
Note: G = Games pitched; IP = Innings pitched; W = Wins; L = Losses; ERA = Earned run average; SO = Strikeouts

Relief pitchers 
Note: G = Games pitched; W = Wins; L = Losses; SV = Saves; ERA = Earned run average; SO = Strikeouts

Notes

References 
1908 Boston Doves season at Baseball Reference

Boston Doves seasons
Boston Doves
Boston Doves
1900s in Boston